Emmanuel Owusu (born 15 January 2001) is a Ghanaian professional footballer, who plays as a midfielder for Moldovan club FC Sfîntul Gheorghe. He previously played for Ghanaian Premier League side Ashanti Gold.

Career

Ashanti Gold 
Owusu started professional career with Obuasi-based team Ashanti Gold in the Ghana Premier League in 2019.  On 5 May 2019, during the  2019 GFA Normalization Committee Competition, he was included in the match day line-up squad in  against Berekum Chelsea. He was chosen to start the game, and marked his first-team debut with a goal in the second half of a 2–1 win. On 15 May 2019, he made two assists, one in the 4th minute to Mumuni Shafiu and the other to Amos Kofi Nkrumah in the 84th minute during a 4–1 win against Aduana Stars.

The following week, Owusu scored a second half brace in an away match against Techiman Eleven Wonders to push Ash Gold to a 3–0 victory. He played his first match of the 2020–21 season when he came on as a late substitute for Eric Esso in a 5–1 victory over King Faisal Babes.

Sfîntul Gheorghe 
Owusu joined Moldovan side FC Sfîntul Gheorghe on a free transfer, signing a one-year deal with club with a chance of signing a long-term contract based on his performance.

References

External links 

 
 

Living people
2001 births
Ghanaian footballers
Association football midfielders
Ashanti Gold SC players
Ghana Premier League players
FC Sfîntul Gheorghe players
Moldovan Super Liga players
Ghanaian expatriate footballers
Ghanaian expatriate sportspeople in Moldova
Expatriate footballers in Moldova